Sathonay-Camp is a commune in the Lyon Metropolis (Auvergne-Rhône-Alpes region), eastern France. The commune was created in 1908, when the former commune Sathonay was split into the communes of Sathonay-Camp and Sathonay-Village. With a population of 6,497 in 2019, it serves as the south terminal of the LGV Sud-Est.

Population

See also
 Communes of the Metropolis of Lyon

References

Communes of Lyon Metropolis